The Halifax Examiner is an online newspaper based in Halifax, Nova Scotia. It was founded in 2014 by Tim Bousquet, former news editor of The Coast alternative weekly paper. Bousquet, known for covering local politics and undertaking long-term investigations and media analysis, describes the outlet as an "independent, adversarial news site devoted to holding the powerful accountable".

The website is supported by subscribers. Most of the daily stories are free, while more in-depth stories and investigative pieces are behind a paywall. A standard subscription costs $10 per month. The website is ad-free, with Bousquet having expressed an aversion to advertising.

The outlet also produces a podcast called "Examineradio".

See also
 AllNovaScotia
 Local Xpress
 Media in Halifax, Nova Scotia

References

External links
 

2014 establishments in Nova Scotia
Canadian news websites
Newspapers published in Halifax, Nova Scotia
Publications established in 2014